John de Comb (or Combe) was the member of Parliament for Gloucester in the Parliament of 1305.

References 

Year of birth missing
Year of death missing
Members of the Parliament of England (pre-1707) for Gloucester